The flag of Bornholm is the unofficial flag of the Danish island Bornholm. It was designed in the mid-1970s after a design by local painter Bent Kaas, and is used to some extent. It is the Danish flag with a green Nordic cross in the centre. The green is said to symbolize the natural greenery of the island. The other variant resembles Norway's Flag, except with a green inner cross.

The flag has no historical foundation. It is primarily used in a tourism context on various products (which are not normally produced on Bornholm), by military units while on exercise in Denmark and on foreign missions, and by mainly German sailors visiting Bornholm. Despite its appreciation, the flag is not officially recognized. Even though it is an unofficial flag, many people still fly it – on vehicles, for example.

However, the Regional Municipality of Bornholm, the former County of Bornholm, as well as the now defunct Danish regiment. Bornholms Værn, had a coat of arms – based on a depiction of a sea serpent – often called a griffin.

References

Nordic Cross flags
Flags of Denmark
Unofficial flags